Alicia Deane is an Australian novel by E. V. Timms set during the Monmouth Rebellion and is about a young woman who is sold into slavery and becomes a pirate.

References

External links
Alicia Deane at AustLit
Full copy of novel

1932 Australian novels
Australian historical novels
Historical romance novels
Monmouth Rebellion in fiction
Novels set in England
Novels set in the 1680s
Novels about pirates
Angus & Robertson books
Australian romance novels